2006 Doda Massacre refers to the massacre of 35 Hindu civilians by unidentified extremists in the Doda district of Jammu and Kashmir, India on 30 April, 2006.

Attacks

Two separate attacks took place on 30 April 2006 in close-by areas.

In the first attack, twenty-two unarmed Hindu villagers, mostly shepherds or their families, were lined up and gunned down in Thawa village in Kulhand area of Doda district. The victims included a 3-year-old girl. Ten to twelve people wearing Indian Army uniforms carried our the massacre. The doctor who was sent to do the post mortem examination suffered a heart attack on seeing the bodies and was admitted to the hospital.

The second attack occurred in the Lalon Galla village in Basantgarh area of Udhampur district. Thirty-five Hindu shepherds were kidnapped and shot dead on the same day.

The attacks were believed to have been an attempt to derail the impending talks between the Indian government and the All Parties Hurriyat Conference.

Perpetrators
The killings received widespread condemnation, including from the President of India A. P. J. Abdul Kalam and Prime Minister Manmohan Singh. The Bharatiya Janata Party accused unidentified "terrorists" of carrying out ethnic cleansing. Others accused the Kashmiri militant group Hizbul Mujahideen. India blamed Pakistan-based terrorist group Lashkar-e-Taiba and called it "cross border terrorism". 

In 2007, Australian government attributed the massacre to Lashkar-e-Taiba, while declaring it to be a terrorist organisation.

References

21st-century mass murder in India
Massacres in 2006
Spree shootings in India
Massacres in India
Massacres in Jammu and Kashmir
Violence against Hindus in India
2000s in Jammu and Kashmir
Terrorist incidents in India in 2006
Doda district
April 2006 events in India
2006 murders in India
Massacres of Hindus in Kashmir
Persecution by Muslims